Makaryino is a rural locality (a village) in Vysokovskoye Rural Settlement, Ust-Kubinsky  District, Vologda Oblast, Russia. The population was 29 as of 2002.

Geography 
Makaryino is located 13 km southeast of Ustye (the district's administrative centre) by road. Semenovskoye is the nearest rural locality.

References

Things to know 
Besides being a rural locality in Vysokovskoye Rural Settlement it has also been linked to various jute colonies such as Karag and Pan. 

Rural localities in Tarnogsky District